Kneen, (pronounced "neen" with the 'K' silent), is a Manx surname. There have been several interpretations of the origin of the surname. Kneen may be an Anglicisation of the Gaelic patronymic Mac Niadháin, which is derived from a pet form of the Gaelic personal name Nia meaning "champion". Another origin attributed to the surname is that Kneen may be derived from the Gaelic Mac Cianain, meaning "son of Cianan". The name Cianan being a diminutive of cian, meaning "long". Another opinion published in the 19th century is that Kneen is possibly a corruption of the surname Nevyn, and derived from the Gaelic Naomh meaning "a saint". This origin has been attributed to the name because Kneen had been thought to be confused in early documents with the surnames Nevyn and Nevyne. An Andrew John Nevyn is recorded in 1417. A Jenkin M'Nyne is recorded in 1429, and later in 1430 his name is recorded as Jenkine Mac Nevyne.

As a surname
Dan Kneen, (1987-2018), professional motorcycle racer
Edgar Kneen, former Australian rules footballer 
John Kneen, (1873-1938), Manx linguist specialising in Manx
Krissy Kneen, Australian bookseller and writer
Steve Kneen, Australian, rugby league player
Thomas Kneen, (1852-1916), Manx, His Majesty's Clerk of the Rolls for the Isle of Man

See also
McNee (disambiguation), derived from the Gaelic Mac Niadh, which is the patronymic form of the Gaelic personal name Nia.
McNiven, derived from the Gaelic Mac Naoimhín.
Nevin, sometimes derived from the Gaelic Mac Naoimhín.

References

Surnames of Manx origin
Manx-language surnames